Nomads Indians Saints is the third studio album by Indigo Girls, released in 1990. It was reissued and remastered in 2000 with three bonus tracks.

Track listing
"Hammer and a Nail" (Emily Saliers) – 3:50
"Welcome Me" (Amy Ray) – 4:36
"World Falls" (Ray) – 3:44
"Southland in the Springtime" (Saliers) – 4:19
"1 2 3" (Ray, Chris McGuire, Cooper Seay, Bryan Lilje, Scott Bland) – 4:12
"Keeper of My Heart" (Ray) – 4:22
"Watershed" (Saliers) – 5:44
"Hand Me Downs" (Ray) – 3:41
"You and Me of the 10,000 Wars" (Saliers) – 4:10
"Pushing the Needle Too Far" (Ray) – 4:12
"The Girl with the Weight of the World in Her Hands" (Saliers) – 4:21

2000 reissue bonus tracks
"Welcome Me" (Live) (Ray) – 4:35 Live at the Hopi Civic Center on the Hopi Reservation, Kyostmovi, AZ, May 24, 1995
Interview by Shawn Colvin – 8:51
"You and Me of the 10,000 Wars" (Live) – 4:21 Live at Paramount Theatre, Denver, CO, October 21 and October 22, 1990

Personnel
Indigo Girls
Amy Ray – vocals, guitars
Emily Saliers – vocals, guitars

Additional personnel
Sara Lee – bass (1-4, 6, 7 & bonus 1)
Paulinho Da Costa – percussion (1, 2, 7, 9)
Kenny Aronoff – drums (1, 2, 7), African drums and percussion (8, 9)
Peter Holsapple – accordion (1 10), keyboard (8)
John Jennings – slide guitar (2), acoustic guitar (4), electric guitar (7)
Benmont Tench – fake accordion (1)
Mary Chapin Carpenter – backing vocals (1, 4)
Gerard McHugh – backing vocals (2)
Peter Buck – Appalachian dulcimer (3)
The Louies – percussion (3)
Michelle Malone – backing vocals (3)
Craig Edwards – fiddle (4)
Jim Keltner – drums (4)
Jay Dee Daugherty – drums (9)
Michael Lorant – drums (10)
Bill Meyers – string arrangements (11)
Jerry Marotta – percussion (bonus 1)
Jane Scarpantoni – cello (bonus 1)

Ellen James Society (track 5)
Chris McGuire – electric rhythm guitar (5)
Cooper Seay – electric lead guitar (5)
Bryan Lilje – bass (5)
Scott Bland – drums (5)

Charts
Album

Single

Certifications

References

1990 albums
Albums produced by Scott Litt
Epic Records albums
Indigo Girls albums